General Dolgorukov may refer to:

Mikhail Petrovich Dolgorukov (1780—1808), Imperial Russian Army major general
Peter Petrovich Dolgorukov (general, born 1744) (1744–1815), Imperial Russian Army infantry general
Vasily Alexandrovich Dolgorukov (1868–1918), Imperial Russian Army general
Vasily Vladimirovich Dolgorukov (1667–1746), Imperial Russian Army general
Vladimir Petrovich Dolgorukov (1773–1817), Imperial Russian Army major general